Onteora may refer to:

 Onteora Mountain
 Onteora Formation
The Onteora Scout Reservation run by the Theodore Roosevelt Council, located in Livingston Manor, New York
The Onteora Central School District, covering the northern portion of Ulster County, New York
The Onteora Park Historic District, located in Greene County, New York